Manzoor Nadir (14 November 1955) is a Guyanese politician and Speaker of the National Assembly. Nadir was the Guyanese Minister of Labour and party leader of The United Force between 2001 and 2011.

Biography
Mazoon Nadir was born in Albouystown, Georgetown on 14 November 1955. He holds a master’s degree in economics from the University of Manchester, and the Bachelor of Commerce degree from the University of Alberta. Nadir is an economist by profession.

Nadir was first elected to the National Assembly in 1992. Nadir served as the Minister of Labour from 2001 until 2011. Nadir became the party leader of The United Force in 2001 and served until 2011. On 1 September 2020, Nadir was elected Speaker of the National Assembly without contest. Lenox Shuman was elected as Deputy Speaker.

As of 19 September 2022, Nadir remains Guyana's Speaker of the National Assembly.

References

Living people
1955 births
Alumni of the University of Manchester
Government ministers of Guyana
Guyanese politicians
People from Georgetown, Guyana
Speakers of the National Assembly (Guyana)
University of Alberta alumni
21st-century Guyanese politicians